Peter de Medburn was an English medieval jurist and university chancellor.

Peter de Medburn was a Doctor of Laws. In 1294, he was Chancellor of the University of Oxford.

References

Year of birth unknown
Year of death unknown
English legal scholars
Chancellors of the University of Oxford
13th-century English people
English male writers